USS Freedom may refer to the following ships operated by the United States Navy:

 , a cargo ship that served during and shortly after World War I
 , a non-commissioned auxiliary schooner that served from 1940 to 1962
 , a littoral combat ship, decommissioned in 2021

United States Navy ship names